Old Asbury Methodist Church is a historic Methodist church located at Walnut and 3rd Streets in Wilmington, New Castle County, Delaware. It was the first Methodist church in Wilmington. The church is a two-story, three bay, "L"-shaped stuccoed stone structure in a vernacular Italianate style.  The original section was built in 1789, and subsequently enlarged in 1820, 1825, 1838, and 1845.  The chapel wing to the north was added in 1875.

It was added to the National Register of Historic Places in 1976.

References

External links
 

Historic American Buildings Survey in Delaware
Methodist churches in Delaware
Italianate architecture in Delaware
Churches completed in 1789
Churches in Wilmington, Delaware
Churches on the National Register of Historic Places in Delaware
1789 establishments in Delaware
National Register of Historic Places in Wilmington, Delaware
18th-century Methodist church buildings in the United States
Cemeteries on the National Register of Historic Places in Delaware
Italianate church buildings in the United States